Jennifer Lucy Bate  (11 November 1944 – 25 March 2020) was a British concert organist. She is known for recording the complete organ works by Olivier Messiaen, guided by the composer, but also recorded, among others, English organ music, and the complete organ works of César Franck, Felix Mendelssohn and Peter Dickinson.

Life 
Born in London, Bate was the daughter of H. A. Bate, organist of St James's at Muswell Hill from 1924 to 1978. She was considered an authority on the organ music of Olivier Messiaen, having befriended him within the last twenty years of his life as his organist of choice. In 1986, she gave the first British performance of his Livre du Saint-Sacrement at Westminster Cathedral and later made the world premiere recording of the work under the personal supervision of the composer, winning the Grand Prix du Disque. She recorded the works at the Eglise de la Sainte-Trinite in Paris, and at the Beauvais Cathedral. He also endorsed her earlier recordings of all of his other organ works. Bate owned scores which contain many personal markings and references made by him.

Bate had a broad repertoire spanning several centuries. She recorded the complete organ works of César Franck and the complete organ music of Felix Mendelssohn, which was reviewed mentioning the "easy fluency of her technique" and "her highly articulate and intelligent interpretations". She recorded much English organ music, from John Stanley to Samuel Wesley, and the complete organ works by Peter Dickinson, whose Organ Concerto she premiered and first recorded. She appeared at The Proms four times between 1974 and 2008.

Bate was briefly married (1968 - 1972), as his second wife, to Sir George Thalben-Ball. She received an honorary doctorate from the University of Bristol in 2007. She was appointed an Officer of the Order of the British Empire (OBE) in the 2008 Birthday Honours. She became an officer of the Ordre des Arts et des Lettres, and a chevalier of the Légion d’Honneur in 2012.

Bate died of cancer on 25 March 2020, aged 75.

References

External links
 
 Jennifer Bate Organ Academy
 
 
 Jennifer Bate / Concert Organist classical-artists.com
 Jennifer Bate Recordings Somm Recordings
 Obituary Celebration of Life

1944 births
2020 deaths
English classical organists
Women organists
People from Muswell Hill
Officers of the Order of the British Empire
Musicians from London
20th-century English musicians
20th-century classical musicians
21st-century English musicians
21st-century classical musicians
21st-century English women musicians
21st-century organists